Mohammad Hadi Karimi  (born September 6, 1974, Tehran), is an Iranian film director and screenwriter.

Filmography

References

External links

1974 births
Living people
People from Tehran
Iranian film directors
Iranian film producers
Iranian screenwriters